Carpinteria State Beach is a protected beach in the state park system of California, in Santa Barbara County, Southern California.

Features
Geography
The park has  of beachfront.
The address is 205 Palm Ave Carpinteria, CA 93013.
History
The  park was established in 1932.

Recreation
Recreational activities include bird watching, ocean swimming, surf fishing, nature walks, camping, and tidepool exploration.

The Carpinteria Harbor Seal Preserve and rookery is located within and south of the park, protecting the Harbor seal (Phoca vitulina). It is one of the four harbor seal rookeries remaining along the Southern California coast.

See also
List of beaches in California
List of California state parks
List of California State Beaches

References

External links
official Carpinteria State Beach website

California State Beaches
Beaches of Southern California
Carpinteria, California
Parks in Santa Barbara County, California
1932 establishments in California
Protected areas established in 1932
Beaches of Santa Barbara County, California